Scutiger glandulatus is a species of frog in the family Megophryidae. It is endemic to China. It is recorded in western Sichuan and northwestern Yunnan, including in Gonggashan National Nature Reserve and Daochengyading National Nature Reserve.

Its natural habitats are subtropical or tropical moist montane forests, temperate grassland, subtropical or tropical high-altitude grassland, and rivers.

References

glandulatus
Amphibians of China
Endemic fauna of China
Taxonomy articles created by Polbot
Amphibians described in 1950